The 1990 West Virginia Mountaineers football team represented West Virginia University in the 1990 NCAA Division I-A football season. It was the Mountaineers' 98th overall season and they competed as a Division I-A Independent. The team was led by head coach Don Nehlen, in his 11th year, and played their home games at Mountaineer Field in Morgantown, West Virginia. They finished the season with a record of four wins and seven losses (4–7 overall).

Schedule

References

West Virginia
West Virginia Mountaineers football seasons
West Virginia Mountaineers football